Legal Case (18 April 1986 – after 2006) was an Irish-bred British-trained Thoroughbred racehorse and sire. He did not appear until the summer of his three-year-old season, but then made rapid progress, winning two minor races and the Select Stakes before recording his biggest win in the Champion Stakes in October 1989. He was never as good again, but did win the Premio Roma in 1990. After his retirement from racing he had some success as a breeding stallion in Brazil.

Background
Legal Case was a bay horse with no white markings bred in Ireland by Ovidstown Investments Ltd. He was sired by the dual Prix de l'Arc de Triomphe winner Alleged out of the mare Maryinsky. Alleged was a successful stallion, and a strong influence for stamina: his best winners included Miss Alleged, Shantou, Law Society and Midway Lady. Maryinsky won two minor races at Del Mar racetrack in 1980. Apart from Legal Case, Maryinsky also produced La Sky, the dam of The Oaks winner Love Divine who in turn produced the St Leger winner Sixties Icon.

During his racing career Legal Case was owned by the businessman Sir Gordon White (later Baron White of Hull) and trained at the Bedford House stable in Newmarket by Luca Cumani.

Racing career

1989: three-year-old season
Legal Case was unraced as a two-year-old and did not appear on a racecourse until June 1989, when he contested a maiden race over eight and a half furlongs at Beverley Racecourse. Ridden by Ray Cochrane he started 8/11 favourite and recovered from a slow start to win by three quarters of a length from Enigma with the pair finishing ten lengths clear of the other twelve runners. A month later he was ridden by Frankie Dettori when he started 2/9 for a graduation race (for horses with no more than one previous win) at Windsor Racecourse and won by six lengths from Silly Habit. Cochrane regained the ride when Legal Case was moved up in class for the Listed Winter Hill Stakes at Windsor in August in which he was matched against older horses for the first time. He started favourite but was beaten three lengths by the Michael Stoute-trained colt Dolpour, with Opening Verse finishing fifth of the seven runners.

In September Legal Case was moved up to Group Three class for the Select Stakes over ten furlongs at Goodwood Racecourse. Ridden by Dettori he started the 7/4 favourite against four opponents. After being restrained in the early stages he took the lead a furlong out and drew away to win by four lengths from Greenwich Papillon with Indian Queen three lengths back in third place. The colt was then moved up to the highest level when he was sent to France to contest the 68th running of the Prix de l'Arc de Triomphe over 2400 metres at Longchamp Racecourse on 8 October. Starting at odds of 18/1 he was towards the rear of the nineteen-runner field for most of the way before making steady progress in the straight and finishing eighth, less than five lengths behind the winner Carroll House.

Less than two weeks after his run at Longchamp, Legal Case, ridden by Cochrane, was one of eleven horses to contest the Champion Stakes over ten furlongs at Newmarket Racecourse. Dolpour was made favourite on 4/1 with Legal Case  5/1 second choice in the betting alongside the four-year-old Ile de Chypre, the winner of the Juddmonte International. The other contenders included the Dewhurst Stakes winner Scenic, the improving handicapper Braashee, the Royal Lodge Stakes winner High Estate and Ile de Nisky (fourth in The Derby). Ile de Chypre led from the start, with Legal Case being restrained towards the rear of the field before making progress in the last quarter mile on the stands side (the left side from the jockeys' viewpoint). Inside the final furlong the three-year-olds Dolpour, Legal Case and Scenic moved up to challenge Ile de Chypre, although Scenic was squeezed for room and failed to maintain his run. The final strides saw Dolpour, Ile de Chypre and Legal Case racing neck-and-neck before crossing the line together. After a photo finish, Legal Case was declared the winner by a head from Dolpour, with Ile de Chypre a short head away in third.

1990: four-year-old season
In 1990 Dettori took over from Cochrane as Cumani's stable jockey. Legal Case remained in training as a four-year-old, but did not appear until the Royal Ascot meeting in June when he finished fourth behind Batshoof, Relief Pitcher and Terimon in the Prince of Wales's Stakes. He started favourite for the Princess of Wales's Stakes at Newmarket on 10 July but never looked likely to win and finished fifth of the seven runners behind Sapience. Eighteen days later he started at odds of 14/1 for the King George VI and Queen Elizabeth Stakes at Ascot but made no impact and came home tenth of the eleven runners. The colt showed better form when he returned in autumn. In his second attempt at the Arc de Triomphe, he finished sixth of the twenty-one runners, six lengths behind the winner Saumarez. When bidding to win a second Champion Stakes on 20 October he stayed on well in the closing stages to take third place behind In the Groove and Linamix. On his final appearance, Legal Case was sent to Italy for the Group One Premio Roma over 2000 metres on heavy ground at Capannelle Racecourse on 10 November. Ridden as in all his races that year by Dettori he won by two lengths and one and a half lengths from Candy Glen (Gran Criterium, Premio Parioli, Prix Daphnis) and Sikeston (Gran Criterium, Premio Parioli, Premio Ribot).

1991: five-year-old season
Training problems kept Legal Case off the racecourse for most of the 1991 season and he made only two appearances in late autumn. On 29 October he started odds-favourite against three opponents in a minor race at Salisbury Racecourse and won by three and a half lengths from the Bosphorus Trophy winner Maraakiz. On his final start he returned to Rome for the Premio Roma in November but finished fifth of eleven behind Sikeston.

Stud career
At the end of his racing career, Legal Case was exported to become a breeding stallion in Brazil. His last foals were born in 2007. The best of his offspring included Evil Knievel, a Grade I winner in Brazil and Virginie, who won the Beverly Hills Handicap at Hollywood Park Racetrack in 1999.

Pedigree

Legal Case was inbred 4 × 4 to Princequillo, meaning that this stallion appears twice in the fourth generation of his pedigree.

References

1986 racehorse births
Racehorses bred in Ireland
Racehorses trained in the United Kingdom
Thoroughbred family 14-c